Huang Yu-Jen (Chinese:黃鈺仁,  Lanborn 9 June 1997) is a Taiwanese taekwondo athlete. He is a current member of the Taiwanese taekwondo national team, and has won the silver medal at the 2017 World Taekwondo Championships in the Men's featherweight category.

References 

1997 births
Living people
Taiwanese male taekwondo practitioners
Taekwondo practitioners at the 2014 Summer Youth Olympics
Taekwondo practitioners at the 2014 Asian Games
Asian Games medalists in taekwondo
Asian Games silver medalists for Chinese Taipei
Medalists at the 2014 Asian Games
Universiade medalists in taekwondo
Taekwondo practitioners at the 2018 Asian Games
Universiade silver medalists for Chinese Taipei
Youth Olympic gold medalists for Chinese Taipei
World Taekwondo Championships medalists
Asian Taekwondo Championships medalists
Medalists at the 2017 Summer Universiade
Taekwondo practitioners at the 2020 Summer Olympics
Olympic taekwondo practitioners of Taiwan
21st-century Taiwanese people